AVN-322 is a 5-hydroxytryptamine subtype 6 receptor antagonist manufactured by Avineuro Pharmaceuticals Inc. that could potentially be used to combat Alzheimer's disease and schizophrenia. AVN-322 also reverses the negative effects of scopolamine and MK-80.

The compound is a sister drug to AVN-101 and AVN-211, two similar compounds under trial for treating Alzheimer's. Phase I trials for the drug were initiated in 2009 by Avineuro, and completed in the spring of 2010. The trials showed that AVN-322 was tolerated in a range of doses without any adverse effects, and Avineuro released plans to commence Phase II trials later the same year. The plan for further trials was discontinued in 2013.

References 

Abandoned drugs
Sulfones
Pyrazolopyrimidines
Secondary amines